Yuvan is an Indian actor, who has appeared in Tamil language films. The son of director Feroze Khan, he made a breakthrough appearing in M. Anbazhagan's Saattai (2012).

Career
The son of director Feroze Khan, Yuvan was keen to work in films and worked as an assistant director in his father's Thambi Arjuna (2010). He then made his debut as an actor with his father's Pasakara Nanbargal, where he was credited as Ajmal Khan. The film had a low key release and received negative reviews from critics. Yuvan made a breakthrough as an actor by playing the lead role of a school student in Saattai (2012). The film opened to positive reviews, while a critic from The Hindu noted "Yuvan could work harder on his expressions". His subsequent films Keeripulla opposite Disha Pandey, Kadhalai Thavira Verondrum Illai with Saranya Mohan and Kamara Kattu, a horror film co-starring Sree Raam, fared less well at the box office and earned negative reviews. During the period, he also worked on Rasu Madhuravan's Sogusu Perundhu, but the film was shelved following the death of the director. Likewise another venture titles Jacky was also shelved midst production.

In 2016, Yuvan worked on Ilami, a period movie set in the year 1700, where he portrayed a youngster who excels at jallikattu. For the role, he put on weight and trained with bulls for his scenes. Yuvan will next play the lead role in director Bala's next project opposite Pragathi Guruprasad; however, the project was later dropped.

Filmography

References

Living people
Male actors in Tamil cinema
21st-century Indian male actors
Male actors from Chennai
Year of birth missing (living people)